Matteo Biffoni (born 19 May 1974 in Prato) is an Italian politician.

He is a member of the Democratic Party and he was elected member of the Chamber of Deputies of Italy in 2013. He served as President of the Province of Prato from 2014 to 2018 and has served as Mayor of Prato since 26 May 2014.

See also
2014 Italian local elections
2019 Italian local elections
List of mayors of Prato

References

External links
 

1974 births
Living people
Mayors of Prato
Democratic Party (Italy) politicians
Presidents of the Province of Prato